Murder of Tides is the first solo album by Centro-Matic and South San Gabriel leader Will Johnson. It was released in 2002 as a joint venture between Johnson and his long-time manager Bob Andrews at Undertow Music Collective.

Track listing 

 Murder of Tides (Westerlies)
 Commonly Linked
 The Riot Jack
 Philo Manitoba
 Karcher's Contacts
 Re-run Pills
 River Koltolwash
 In a Motionless Way 
 Tent of Total Mystery 
 The Yellow Signals

References

External links
Official site

Centro-Matic albums
2002 albums